The Java Platform Module System specifies a distribution format for collections of Java code and associated resources. It also specifies a repository for storing these collections, or modules, and identifies how they can be discovered, loaded and checked for integrity. It includes features such as namespaces with the aim of fixing some of the shortcomings in the existing JAR format, especially the JAR Hell, which can lead to issues such as classpath and class loading problems.

The Java Module System was initially being developed under the Java Community Process as JSR 277 and was scheduled to be released with Java 7.

JSR 277 later was put on hold and Project Jigsaw was created to modularize the JDK. This JSR was superseded by JSR 376 (Java Platform Module System).

Project Jigsaw was originally intended for Java 7 (2011) but was deferred to Java 8 (2014) as part of Plan B, and again deferred to a Java 9 release in 2017. Java 9 including the Java Module System was released on September 21, 2017.

Architecture 
The Java Module System implemented in Java 9 includes the following JEPs and JSR (Java Specification Request):
 JEP 200: The Modular JDK: Define a modular structure for the JDK
 JEP 201: Modular Source Code: Reorganize the JDK source code into modules, enhance the build system to compile modules, and enforce module boundaries at build time
 JEP 220: Modular Run-Time Images: Restructure the JDK and JRE run-time images to accommodate modules and to improve performance, security, and maintainability
 JEP 261: Module System: Implement the Java Platform Module System
 JEP 282: The Java Linker: Create a tool that can assemble and optimize a set of modules and their dependencies into a custom run-time image
 JSR 376: Java Platform Module System

Additionally, several other JDK 9 features have been added to ease transition to the module system:
 JEP 238: Multi-Release JAR Files: Extend the JAR file format to allow multiple, Java-release-specific versions of class files to coexist in a single archive.
 JEP 253: Prepare JavaFX UI Controls & CSS APIs for Modularization: Define public APIs for the JavaFX functionalities that is presently only available via internal APIs and would become inaccessible due to modularization.
 JEP 260: Encapsulate Most Internal APIs: Make most of the JDK's internal APIs inaccessible by default but leave a few critical, widely-used internal APIs accessible, until supported replacements exist for all or most of their functionality.
 JEP 275: Modular Java Application Packaging: The Java packager will evolve for JDK 9, making it aware of modules, allowing for example to package a module and all the modules it depends on.

Properties of modules 

Modules are a new way of grouping code. Contrary to Jar files, modules explicitly declare which modules they depend on, and what packages they export. Explicit dependency declarations improve the integrity of the code, by making it easier to reason about large applications and the dependencies between software components.

The module declaration is placed in a file named module-info.java at the root of the module’s source-file hierarchy. The JDK will verify dependencies and interactions between modules both at compile-time and runtime.

For example, the following module declaration declares that the module com.foo.bar depends on another com.foo.baz module, and exports the following packages: com.foo.bar.alpha and com.foo.bar.beta:
module com.foo.bar {
    requires com.foo.baz;
    exports com.foo.bar.alpha;
    exports com.foo.bar.beta;
}
The public members of com.foo.bar.alpha and com.foo.bar.beta packages will be accessible by dependent modules. Private members are inaccessible even through a means such as reflection. Note that in Java versions 9 through 16, whether such 'illegal access' is de facto permitted depends on a command line setting.

The JDK itself has been modularized in Java 9.

Links with OSGi 
The Java Module System does not intend to support all the functionalities that  the OSGi platform currently supports (for example the Life-Cycle model and the Services Registry). However the Java Module System will support functions which are not supported by OSGi, such as modularity at compile-time, and built-in support for native libraries. A couple of articles exploring how the Java Module System and OSGi could interoperate were published in 2016.  These can be found on InfoQ and also the OSGi Alliance Blog.

See also 
 Java package
 Classpath (Java)
 Java Classloader

References

External links 
 JSR 277
 JSR 294
 JSR 376
 Project Jigsaw
 The State of the Module System
 Java Platform Module System: Issue Summary

Java specification requests